Mark XIX or Mark 19 may refer to:

Military
 Mk 19 grenade launcher, a widely used American belt-fed weapon that fires 40 mm grenades
 Mark 19 torpedo, a prototype American torpedo
 Desert Eagle or Mark XIX (1982), a U.S.-Israeli large caliber semi-automatic pistol
 Logistics Vehicle System MK19 Rear Body Unit; US Marine Corps heavy tactical vehicle trailer incorporating a crane

United Kingdom
 BL 6-inch Gun Mk XIX (1916–1940), an artillery piece made by Vickers
 CP Mk.XIX, a Royal Navy central-pivot twin-mount carrying two quick-firing 4 in guns
 HA/LA Mk.XIX, a Royal Navy High Angle / Low Angle twin-mount carrying two quick-firing 4 in guns
 De Havilland Mosquito NF Mk XIX, a night fighter variant De Havilland Mosquito that could mount American or British radar
 Supermarine Spitfire Mk 19 (1944), the last and most successful Supermarine Spitfire photographic reconnaissance variant
 Vickers Wellington T Mk XIX, service conversion of the Vickers Wellington Mk X for use as a navigation trainer
 ASV Mk. 19 (Anti Surface Vessel), an EKCO airborne radar fitted to the Royal Navy Fairey Gannet